Elections to the French National Assembly were held in the Comoros on 10 November 1946. The territory elected a single seat, with Saïd Mohamed Cheikh re-elected unopposed.

Results

References

Comoros
1946 11
1946 in the Comoros